This is a list of winners and nominees of the Primetime Emmy Award for Outstanding Supporting Actor in a Limited or Anthology Series or Movie. Before 1975, supporting actors featured in a miniseries or movie were included in categories such as comedy or drama. From 1975 to 1978, the award was called Outstanding Single Performance by a Supporting Actor in a Comedy or Drama Special. Despite the category's name, actors appearing in many episodes of a miniseries were included. In 1979, the award was named Outstanding Supporting Actor in a Limited Series or Special. The award was renamed again in 1986, in Outstanding Supporting Actor in a Miniseries or Special. By 1998, the award was renamed Outstanding Supporting Actor in a Miniseries or Movie.

Winners and nominations

1970s

1980s

1990s

2000s

2010s

2020s

Programs with multiple nominations

6 nominations
 American Crime Story

5 nominations
 American Horror Story

4 nominations
 Angels in America
 Fargo
 The Normal Heart

3 nominations
 And the Band Played On
 Baby M
 Dopesick
 Hamilton
 John Adams
 Roots: The Next Generations
 The Thorn Birds
 Watchmen
 When They See Us
 The White Lotus

2 nominations
 12 Angry Men
 Backstairs at the White House
 Barbarians at the Gate
 Brideshead Revisited
 Broadway Bound
 Bury My Heart at Wounded Knee
 Citizen X
 Conspiracy
 Death of a Salesman
 Eleanor and Franklin: The White House Years
 Elizabeth I
 Empire Falls
 Feud
 Hollywood
 The Josephine Baker Story
 Little Dorrit
 Masada
 Mildred Pierce
 Miss Evers' Boys
 The Night Of
 Our Fathers
 QB VII
 Raid on Entebbe
 The Rat Pack
 Recount
 RKO 281
 Sherlock
 Shōgun
 Too Big to Fail

Performers with multiple wins

2 wins
 Beau Bridges
 Michael Moriarty

Performers with multiple nominations

4 nominations
 Brian Dennehy

3 nominations
 Beau Bridges
 John Gielgud
 John Malkovich
 Joe Mantegna
 Michael K. Williams

2 nominations
 Alan Alda
 Ralph Bellamy
 Art Carney
 Don Cheadle
 Dabney Coleman
 James Cromwell
 Hume Cronyn
 Charles Durning
 Ed Flanders
 Martin Freeman
 Danny Glover
 John Glover
 John Goodman
 Harold Gould
 Derek Jacobi
 James Earl Jones
 Richard Kiley
 John Leguizamo
 Ian McKellen
 Burgess Meredith
 Alfred Molina
 Michael Moriarty
 Denis O'Hare
 Peter O'Toole
 Laurence Olivier
 Jim Parsons
 Christopher Plummer
 Jonathan Pryce
 Randy Quaid
 Anthony Quayle
 David Strathairn
 Michael Stuhlbarg
 Stanley Tucci
 Tom Wilkinson
 Finn Wittrock

See also
 TCA Award for Individual Achievement in Drama
 Critics' Choice Television Award for Best Supporting Actor in a Movie/Miniseries
 Golden Globe Award for Best Supporting Actor – Series, Miniseries or Television Film
 Screen Actors Guild Award for Outstanding Performance by a Male Actor in a Miniseries or Television Movie

References

Supporting Actor in a Miniseries or Movie
 
Emmy Award